Tommy DeVito may refer to:

 Tommy DeVito (American football), American football quarterback
 Tommy DeVito (musician) (1928–2020), American musician and singer, member of The Four Seasons
 Tommy DeVito, a character in the film Goodfellas based on real-life gangster Thomas DeSimone